The Doriot Climatic Chambers (DCCs) are a pair of very large, highly specialized wind tunnels/environmental chambers located at the U.S. Army’s Soldier Systems Center (SSC) in Natick, Massachusetts. Built in 1952, the Chambers are a unique facility, capable of simulating an extreme range of global weather conditions for the testing of both the physical properties of military equipment and the physiology and adaptations of human subjects.

A variety of tenants utilize the DCCs, which are operated by the U.S. Army Research, Development, and Engineering Command (RDECOM).

History
The DCCs were constructed from 1952 to 1954 at the time of the founding of what is now the U.S. Army Research, Development, and Engineering Command (RDECOM) and  Center.

At a rededication ceremony on 24 August 1994, the facility was named for Brigadier General Georges F. Doriot (1899–1987), a French-American who, during World War II, worked with a large staff in the Quartermaster Corps to develop, test and quickly field improved clothing and equipment for the U.S. soldier.

A major renovation was completed in 1996.

Research

Users
A number of tenants of the SSC utilize the DCCs including USARIEM, the NCTRF, and the USMC.

Equipment testing
Examples of military equipment evaluated at the DCC include tents, parachutes, heaters, airbeams, medical devices and wild mills. The heat transfer properties of a wide range of new protective military clothing are tested at the DCC. Constant control of temperature (to within +/- 1 °F) is possible with simultaneous control of both wind and humidity. (Other chambers in the world have only two-environmental-parameter capability, making the DCCs unique.) External observer and test monitoring areas have electronic data acquisition systems to record a variety of testing parameters and provide customized plotting, graphing and printouts.

Human research
.

The DCCs are man-rated for human safety. Human research in the DCC is aimed at the prevention of injuries and the minimizing of performance decrements in order to enhance overall operational effectiveness. The Chambers simulate types of environmental conditions that soldiers may encounter in the course of their real world duties. Soldier (and civilian) volunteers walk or run on treadmills to simulate a variety of work rates at different environmental extremes. A facility kitchen prepares meals to test the effects of nutrition on physical performance. The DCCs include a dormitory facility for sleep studies as well as dressing rooms, showers and laundering facilities which support prolonged live-in studies.

Specifications and capabilities
In addition, chambers of 30 by 18 by  occupy the area at the back of each tunnel.

Tropic Wind Tunnel
 -18 °C to 74 °C (0 °F to 165 °F)
 10-90% relative humidity
 Simulated rain up to 4 inches/hour
 Simulated wind up to 
 Solar loading capability

Arctic Wind Tunnel
 -57 °C to 49 °C (-70 °F to 120 °F)
 10-90% relative humidity
 Simulated rain up to 4 inches/hour
 Simulated wind up to 
 Solar loading capability

Tropic Conditioning Room
 Dimensions: 25 by 15 by 
 4 °C to 65 °C (40 °F to 150 °F)
 10-90% relative humidity above

Arctic Conditioning Room
 Dimensions: 25 by 15 by 
 -45 °C to 21 °C (-50 °F to 70 °F)

References
Earls, Alan R., (2005) U.S. Army Natick Laboratories: The Science Behind the Soldier (Series: Images of America), Arcadia Publishing. (Includes photos of the construction of DCCs.)
This article contains information that originally came from US Government publications and websites and is in the public domain.

External links
DCCs page at the NSC Website
US Army Soldier Systems service

Research installations of the United States Army
Military medicine in the United States
Natick, Massachusetts